Holoptygma lurida is a species of moth of the family Tortricidae. It is found in Colombia, Ecuador and Costa Rica.

References

Moths described in 1912
Atteriini